Phrantela richardsoni is a species of minute freshwater snail with an operculum, an aquatic gastropod mollusc or micromollusc in the family Hydrobiidae. This species is endemic to Australia.

References

Gastropods of Australia
Phrantela
Gastropods described in 1993
Taxonomy articles created by Polbot